The 2022 Supersport World Championship was the twenty-sixth season of the Supersport World Championship, the twenty-fourth held under this name. The championship was won by Dominique Aegerter at the Mandalika round.

Race calendar and results

The provisional 2022 season calendar was announced on 25 November 2021.

Regulation changes 
Following a large overhaul of rules allowing larger-capacity engines, some new manufacturers and models will be eligible. Ducati will return to the series with their Panigale V-twin, two MV models and Triumph three cylinders will rejoin the series with the Street Triple RS, to combat the dominance of Japanese manufacturers Yamaha and Kawasaki.

Entry list

Rider changes 
 After leaving the Superbike World Championship in 2020, Althea Racing returned in the Supersport World Championship, with the Italian Federico Caricasulo.
 Aruba.it Racing - Ducati joined the Supersport World Championship with Nicolò Bulega, who left Moto2.
 Barni Racing Team expanded into the Supersport World Championship, racing with the Australian Oli Bayliss.
 CM Racing raced with Maximilian Kofler, who moved from Moto3 and replaced Luca Bernardi, who moved up to the Superbike World Championship.
 Motozoo Racing raced with an all-new line up with Jeffrey Buis and Benjamin Currie, replacing Shogo Kawasaki and Michel Fabrizio.
 Patrick Hobelsberger joined Kallio Racing.
 Yari Montella joined Kawasaki Puccetti Racing with Can Öncü, replacing Philipp Öttl, who moved to the Superbike World Championship.
 2021 Supersport 300 World Champion Adrián Huertas joined the Supersport World Championship with MTM Kawasaki.
 PTR Racing announced its return to the World Supersport grid with a brand new Triumph Street Triple 765 RS and rebranded as Dynavolt Triumph, fielding Hannes Soomer and Stefano Manzi
 Leonardo Taccini joined Ten Kate Racing Yamaha and replaced Galang Hendra Pratama who moved to the ARRC Supersport 600 class.

Championship standings
Points

Riders' championship

Teams' championship

Manufacturers' championship

Notes

References

External links 

Supersport World Championship seasons
Supersport